West Lawn may refer to a place in the United States:

West Lawn, Chicago, Illinois, a neighborhood
West Lawn, Pennsylvania, a former borough and current census-designated place
West Lawn (Lancaster, Pennsylvania), a historic home